Dalibor Brun (born 19 September 1949) is a Croatian recording artist who rose to prominence with his work in Yugoslav music acts Uragani and Korni Grupa, but also maintained a successful solo career since 1969.

Brun remains an eminent musician in the Croatian music scene, with songs that blend modern pop and the chanson genre heavily influenced by his native Rijeka.

He had participated three times in the annual Split festival (1975. Lipa luna, 1976. Ja te ljubim, 1983. Uspavanka), three times in the Zagreb festival (1972. Miruj, miruj, srce, 1973. Otkad si tuđa žena, 1975. I poveo sam je u travu) and twice in the Opatija festival (1975. Ruže, 1976. Ne pitaj me zašto). He also took part in the Croatian Band Aid, and provided vocals for the Croatian patriotic song Moja domovina.

Discography 
 Prolaze godine/Tvoje plave oči, Liza, 1969.
 Ovaj život s tobom/Za tebe, 1970.
 Djeca ljubavi/Uvek ću ostati tvoj, 1970.
 Kidajmo lance ljubavi/Marie, 1971.
 Spavaj pored mene/Noći pune tebe, 1971.
 Zašto me ostavljaš?/Moja, moja, 1972.
 Miruj, miruj, srce/Nema više ljubavi, 1972.
 Suze, suze/Ekstaza, 1972.
 Nevjerna je ona bila/Bit ću s tobom, 1973.
 Voljenoj, 1973.
 Otkad si tuđa žena/Što želiš od mene, 1973.
 Tiha tugo moja/Željena, 1974.
 Ponovo na poznatom putu, 1974.
 Živi kako hoćeš/Kuca li srce zbog mene, 1974.
 I poveo sam je u travu/Voliš li - čekaj me, 1975.
 Lipa luna/Ti si žena, 1975.
 Ruže/Nedaj, nedaj moja ljubavi, 1975.
 Ja te ljubim/Proljetna pjesma, 1976.
 Ne pitaj me zašto/Moj bolni krvav cvijet, 1976.
 Poludjela ptica, 1976.
 Zaboravit ću tebe/Dok smo zajedno bili, 1977.
 Nosio sam cvijeće pod prozore/Kad ti jednom bude dosta, 1977.
 Pozdravimo se, 1993.
 Sve najbolje od Dalibora Bruna, 1995.
 Ranjena duša, 1996.
 Zašto me zoveš, 1998.
 Živim, kako znam, kako mogu, 2000.
 Nema spavanja, 2008.
 Megamix br. 1
 Megamix br. 2

References

1949 births
Living people
Musicians from Rijeka
Croatian folk-pop singers
Croatian pop singers
20th-century Croatian male singers